A. Clarke (first name and dates of birth and death unknown) was an English cricketer.  Clarke's batting style is unknown, though it is known he was a right-arm fast bowler.

Clarke made a single first-class appearance for Leicestershire against Essex in the 1902 County Championship at Aylestone Road, Leicester.  In this match, he took the wickets of Gilbert Tosetti and Bill Reeves in Essex's first-innings, finishing with figures of 2/70 from 19 overs.  In a match which was heavily affected by rain, Clarke wasn't called upon to bat.

References

External links
 A. Clarke at ESPNcricinfo
 A. Clarke at CricketArchive

English cricketers
Leicestershire cricketers
Year of birth missing
Year of death missing